Franco Coppola (born 31 March 1957) is an Italian prelate of the Catholic Church who has been  Apostolic Nuncio to Belgium and Luxembourg since 2021. He has served in the diplomatic service of the Holy See since 1993.

Biography
Coppola was born in Maglie on 31 March 1957. He was ordained priest on 12 September 1981. He was incardinated in the diocese of Otranto.  He attended the Pontifical Ecclesiastical Academy while at the same time studying for a doctorate in canon law at a pontifical university.  He entered the diplomatic service of the Holy See on 1 July 1993, he served at the pontifical representations in Lebanon, Colombia, Poland and at the Section for Relations with States of the Secretariat of State.

In 2003 as the Middle East director Coppola accompanied Cardinal Roger Etchegaray to Iraq on a peace mission before the war began.

He served with the rank of Counsellor at the Nunciature in Burundi.

On 16 July 2009, Pope Benedict XVI appointed him Apostolic Nuncio to Burundi and Titular Archbishop of Vinda.

He was consecrated by Pope Benedict XVI with Cardinals Tarcisio Bertone and William Levada as co-consecrators on 12 September 2009, the twenty-eighth anniversary of his ordination to the priesthood, along with Gabriele Giordano Caccia, Giorgio Corbellini and Pietro Parolin.

On 31 January 2014, Pope Francis named him Apostolic Nuncio to the Central African Republic. On 2 April 2014, Pope Francis named Coppola Nuncio to Chad.

On 9 July 2016, Pope Francis appointed him Nuncio to Mexico. In December 2017, he forcefully reiterated Francis' criticism of the Mexican bishops saying that "The Church here in Mexico has been lagging behind and has continued to give valid answers for the last century, without realizing that time has meanwhile gone on."

Speaking in 2021, at the opening of the Mexican bishops' conference biannual meeting, he urged the country's bishops to "look reality in the eye" as the country's non-Catholic population increases and nonreligious numbers rise. He spoke of several worrying trends in the 2020 census which showed the number of people identifying as nonreligious nearly doubling to 8.1% of the population, while another 2.5% of the population considered themselves religious, but without any professed confession. Protestants and evangelicals grew from 7.5% of the population in 2010 to 11.2% of the population in 2020.

On 15 November he was named Nuncio to Belgium and
on 14 December 2021 he was named Nuncio to Luxembourg.

See also
 List of heads of the diplomatic missions of the Holy See

References

External links

1957 births
Living people
People from Maglie
21st-century Italian Roman Catholic titular archbishops
Pontifical Ecclesiastical Academy alumni
Apostolic Nuncios to the Central African Republic
Apostolic Nuncios to Mexico
Apostolic Nuncios to Burundi
Apostolic Nuncios to Chad
Apostolic Nuncios to Luxembourg
Apostolic Nuncios to Belgium